Andriy Anatoliyovych Gordeev (Ukrainian: Андрій Анатолійович Гордєєв; born on June 13, 1983,  Nadiivka Village Chaplynka Raion, Kherson Oblast) is a Ukrainian politician, people's deputy of Ukraine of the VIIIth convocation, who was the Head of Kherson Oblast State Administration from April 2016 until April 2019.

Bibliography
He was born on June 13, 1983 in Nadiivka Village Chaplynka Kherson Oblast. 
In 2000 he graduated from Tominobalkivska Secondary School I—III levels in Tomina Balka Village Bilozerka Raion Kherson Oblast.
In 2003 he graduated from International University of Business and Law, the Faculty of Law.
In 2007 he graduated from International Science-Technical University, the Faculty of Law.
In 2009 he graduated from Kyiv National Economic University named after Vadym Hetman, the Faculty of Law; Master of Law;
In 2014 he graduated from National Academy for Public Administration under the President of Ukraine, Master of Management of Society Development.

Career
2003–2004 — a lawyer-consultant of Open joint-stock company "Plant «Delta»;
2004–2005 — a lawyer-consultant of Limited Liability Company «Mechanical Plant»;
2004 – 2012 — a leading lawyer-consultant, the head of Law Department  Limited Liability Company «Mechanical Plant»;
2012 – 2014 — advisor-consultant of  Ukraine's people's deputy;
2012 – 2015 — Kherson City Council Deputy of the VIth convocation;
2014 – 2016 — people's deputy of Ukraine;
In April, 2016 – he was appointed the Head of Kherson Region State Administration.
In accordance with the President's of Ukraine act dated from April 28, 2016, No. 178/2016.

Early April 2019 Gordieiev filed a resignation letter but did not specify the reasons why. The previous months activists had demanded from President Petro Poroshenko to dismiss Gordieiev because they considered him complicit in organizing the assassination of Kherson activist Kateryna Handziuk. According to Gordieiev he resigned prior to the second round of the 2019 Ukrainian presidential election so that the allegations "fabricated against him" should not affect the second round of the election. (President Poroshenko had won second place in the first round of the presidential election.) On 10 April the Cabinet of Ministers of Ukraine approved the dismissal.

References

External links
 

1983 births
Living people
People from Kherson Oblast
Kyiv National Economic University alumni
National Academy of State Administration alumni
Eighth convocation members of the Verkhovna Rada
Governors of Kherson Oblast
Petro Poroshenko Bloc politicians